Bechard is an unincorporated community in Saskatchewan near Riceton.

Lajord No. 128, Saskatchewan
Unincorporated communities in Saskatchewan
Division No. 6, Saskatchewan